The Battle of Lake Baikal was a naval battle undertaken by Czechoslovak forces.

Background 
In August 1918, the Czechoslovak legion, under the leadership of Gajda, fought the Red Army for control of the mountain passes around Lake Baikal which were well defended. Gajda was troubled by the fact that Baikal was completely under the control of the Red Army's ships, which threatened the Czechoslovak units with landing units to the legion's rear.

While occupying various ports on the shores of the Baikal, the Czechoslovak legionaries managed to capture two enemy steamships, the "Sibirjak" and the "Fedosia". These were later refitted with a pair of howitzers each.

Battle 

On August 15, the Czechoslovak fleet sailed out of Listvyanka. By noon on August 16, the ships were about 8 km from the port in Mysovsk in heavy fog. After a few minutes, the fog started dissipating and the ships spotted Babushkin. 

The Red Army forces defending the town were under the impression that the approaching ships were friendly vessels bringing in supplies. This allowed the ships to approach the harbor to a distance of approximately 4 kilometers. By the time the defenders of Babushkin realized their error, it was too late. The icebreaker Baikal tried to initiate fire upon the Czechoslovak ships but they were faster. They began to fire, both at the Baikal and at the harbor. The Baikal was sunk and general confusion erupted in Babushkin. The train station was in flames. An armored train arrived after half an hour of Czechoslovak bombardment. Guns were offloaded from it and began to return fire upon the Czechoslovak ships. Since the main mission of destroying the harbor and train station were completed, the legionaries left the battle. On the return journey they met the enemy ship Angara which decided to evade battle. The rest of the  journey was uneventful and they returned to Listvyanka without any further incidents.

Aftermath
News of the Czechoslovak Legion's campaign in Siberia during the summer of 1918 was welcomed by Allied statesmen in Great Britain and France, who saw the operation as a means to reconstitute an eastern front against Germany. U.S. President Woodrow Wilson, who had resisted earlier Allied proposals to intervene in Russia, gave in to domestic and foreign pressure to support the legionaries' evacuation from Siberia. In early July 1918, he published an aide-mémoire calling for a limited intervention in Siberia by the U.S. and Japan to rescue the Czechoslovak troops, who had been blocked by Bolshevik forces in Transbaikal.

However, the Czechoslovaks had already fought their way through. By the time most American and Japanese units landed in Vladivostok, the Czechoslovaks were already there to welcome them. The Allied intervention in Siberia continued so that by autumn of 1918, there were 70,000 Japanese, 829 British, 1,400 Italian, 5,002 American and 107 French colonial (Vietnamese) troops in the region. Many of these contingents supported anti-Bolshevik Russians and Cossack warlords who had established regional governments in the wake of the Czechoslovak seizure of the Trans-Siberian Railway.

The Czechoslovak Legion's campaign in Siberia impressed Allied statesmen and attracted them to the idea of an independent Czechoslovak state. As the legionaries cruised from one victory to another that summer, the Czechoslovak National Council began receiving official statements of recognition from various Allied governments.

References

External links 
 Bisher, Jamie (2005), White Terror: Cossack Warlords of the Trans-Siberian. London and New York: Routledge. 
 Námořní bitva 
 Československé vojenství - Věřte nevěřte - Archiv 2003
 Gajda, Radola :: G :: Československo (CZK)

Naval battles involving Russia
Battles of the Russian Civil War
Naval battles of the Russian Civil War
Battles involving Bohemia
Battle of Lake Baikal
August 1918 events
1918 in Russia